Grassy Ridge Bald is a bald mountain in North Carolina and is part of the Roan Highlands, within the Pisgah National Forest.  Its elevation reaches  and is on the boundary between Avery County, North Carolina (highest point) and Mitchell County, North Carolina. The mountain generates feeder streams for the North Toe River.

See also
 List of mountains in North Carolina

References

Mountains of North Carolina
Southern Sixers
Mountains of Avery County, North Carolina
Landforms of Mitchell County, North Carolina
Mountains on the Appalachian Trail